The European Union (Withdrawal) Act 2019, also known as the Repeal Bill is an Act of the Gibraltar Parliament announced by Chief Minister Fabian Picardo, that transposed directly-applicable European Union law into the law of Gibraltar as part of the UK's exit from the European Union (Brexit). It has the same effect as the similarly named European Union (Withdrawal) Act 2018 in the UK.

The bill was passed with the support of the governing GSLP-Liberal coalition and an independent MP. The opposition Gibraltar Social Democrats originally did not intend to support the bill but later voted for it, but against parts of the legislation.

See also
European Union (Withdrawal) Act 2018
European Parliamentary Elections Act 2002
European Union (Amendment) Act 2008
European Union Act 2011
United Kingdom invocation of Article 50 of the Treaty on European Union
Gibraltar after Brexit

External links
 Full text

References

Gibraltar and the European Union
2019 in the European Union
Consequences of the 2016 United Kingdom European Union membership referendum
Brexit
2019 in Gibraltar
2019 in law